Harold Pope may refer to:
 Harold Pope (cricketer), English cricketer
 Harold Pope Jr., member of the New Mexico Senate
 Harold Pope (soldier), Australian Army officer